Saint Lu is the debut album by the Austrian singer-songwriter Luise Gruber, better known as Saint Lu. It features collaborations with the guitarist Peter Weihe. The album was critically acclaimed, but failed to chart higher than #30 in Austria.

Track listing

iTunes  bonus track

CD edition bonus track

iTunes  Acoustic EP

Singles
 Don't Miss Your Own Life

 Here I Stand

 Rockstar Car

2009 debut albums
European Border Breakers Award-winning albums